Big Inner is the debut album from the artist Matthew E. White, released on August 21, 2012, on Spacebomb Records and Hometapes in the United States and Canada and on January 21, 2013, on Domino in the rest of the world.

Reception 

Big Inner debuted at #19 on Billboards Heatseekers Albums chart. The album received five stars from The Guardian and was called "One of the great albums of modern Americana" by Uncut magazine. It appeared on several "best of the year" lists in 2012, including those on Consequence of Sound, Pitchfork, and Blurt Magazine, and as a result of the album, White was named the #1 Best New Band by Paste and 2012 Breakthrough by eMusic.

Reissue 
In October 2013, Domino reissued Big Inner as a deluxe edition entitled Big Inner: Outer Face Edition with a second disc entitled Outer Face EP included with the original album.

Track listing

Personnel 

Over 30 musicians appear on the album: the Spacebomb House Band (Cameron Ralston on bass, Pinson Chanselle on drums and percussion, and Matthew E. White on guitar and vocals), a nine-piece horn section, an eight-piece string section, and a ten-piece choir.

Production
 Matthew E. White – producer, horn arrangements
 Phil Cook – choir arrangements
 Trey Pollard – string arrangements
 Lance Koehler – engineer
 Karl Blau – engineer, mixing
 Gene Paul – mastering

References 

Domino Recording Company albums
2012 debut albums
Matthew E. White albums
Spacebomb Records albums